Sergeyevka is a rural locality (a village) in Uchpilinsky Selsoviet, Dyurtyulinsky District, Bashkortostan, Russia. The population was 4 as of 2010. There is 1 street.

Geography 
Sergeyevka is located 28 km northeast of Dyurtyuli (the district's administrative centre) by road. Novokangyshevo is the nearest rural locality.

References 

Rural localities in Dyurtyulinsky District